Adam Robert Wilk (born December 9, 1987) is an American former professional baseball pitcher. He previously played in Major League Baseball (MLB) for the Detroit Tigers, Los Angeles of Anaheim, New York Mets, and Minnesota Twins as well as in the KBO League with the NC Dinos.

Amateur career

Wilk graduated from Cypress High School in Cypress, California, then attended Long Beach State, and in 2007 played for the Newport Gulls of the NECBL. He still holds the team records for lowest opponent batting average (.153) and fewest hits allowed (25). In 2008, he played collegiate summer baseball with the Orleans Cardinals of the Cape Cod Baseball League and was named a league all-star.

Professional career

Detroit Tigers
The Detroit Tigers called Wilk up to the majors for the first time on May 24, 2011 when Phil Coke was placed on the 15-day disabled list with a bone bruise in his right foot.

On May 26, 2011, Wilk made his major league debut against the Boston Red Sox, relieving Max Scherzer in the middle of the third inning. He pitched 3.2 innings, gave up one unearned run, struck out four batters, two hits, and one walk.

On May 28, 2011, Wilk was optioned to Triple-A Toledo to make room for recently acquired David Purcey.

NC Dinos
On December 19, 2012, Wilk's contact was sold by the Tigers to the Korean NC Dinos. He signed a minor league deal with the Pittsburgh Pirates on December 18, 2013.

Los Angeles Angels
Wilk signed a minor league deal with the Los Angeles Angels of Anaheim on December 5, 2014. He was designated for assignment on July 25, 2015.

Tampa Bay Rays
The Tampa Bay Rays signed Wilk to a minor league contract on January 19, 2016. Wilk spent the 2016 season pitching for the Durham Bulls. He entered free agency on November 7, 2016.

New York Mets
On January 12, 2017, Wilk signed a minor league contract with the New York Mets and was invited to spring training. He was called up to the Mets on May 7, and designated for assignment on May 8.

Minnesota Twins
The Minnesota Twins claimed Wilk on waivers on May 10, 2017. He was designated for assignment on May 27, 2017,
and outrighted to Triple-A two days later. On June 18, Wilk was again designated for assignment. He was released four days later.

Cleveland Indians
On January 20, 2018, Wilk signed a minor league deal with the Cleveland Indians. He elected free agency on November 3, 2018.

Personal life
Wilk was noted for his community involvement while with the Toledo Mud Hens. In the 2012–2013 offseason, he began his own non-profit organization, the Adam Wilk Foundation.

References

External links 

Career statistics and player information from Korea Baseball Organization

1987 births
Living people
Detroit Tigers players
NC Dinos players
Los Angeles Angels players
New York Mets players
Minnesota Twins players
Long Beach State Dirtbags baseball players
Orleans Firebirds players
Oneonta Tigers players
West Michigan Whitecaps players
Lakeland Flying Tigers players
Erie SeaWolves players
Toledo Mud Hens players
Salt Lake Bees players
Indianapolis Indians players
Major League Baseball pitchers
Baseball players from Anaheim, California
KBO League pitchers
American expatriate baseball players in South Korea
Durham Bulls players
Las Vegas 51s players
Rochester Red Wings players
Columbus Clippers players